Kuether is a surname of German origin. Notable people with the surname include:

 Annie Kuether (born 1950), American politician
 Joe Kuether (born 1988), American professional poker player

Surnames of German origin